Dancing Champion is a Kannada dance reality show aired on  Colors Kannada and streamed on Voot. It features celebrities as contestants who are paired with professional dancers competing for a cash prize and the title Dancing Champion. The judges of the show are Mayuri Upadhya, Vijay Raghavendra and Meghana Raj. The show is hosted by Akul Balaji. The show premiered on 8 January 2022.

Production 
The show is a competition where a 14 celebrities are paired with exceptionally talented common people, handpicked from all across Karnataka. Well-known faces & fresh ones pair-up for a phenomenal dance-off. Contestants dance to a different tune, different theme and different styles every week and scores are given by the judges. Each week one couple is eliminated based on their scores with only one pair having the chance to be finally crowned, Dancing Champion. The show is produced by actor Srujan Lokesh under his banner Lokesh Productions.

Creative Team 
 Prakash Gopikrishna
 Lakshmi Sagar 
 Prabha Ram
 Ravi Shankar
 Ramya Krishna
 Akshay

Technical Team 
 Deepak Singh (Supervisor Choregrapher) 
 Elton Mascarenhas (Assistant Supervisor Choregrapher)
 Namit (Light Jockey)
 Sampath Sukhine (Video jockey)
 Puneet (Switcher)
 Rajesh (Online Editor)
 Saish Bharadwaj (Music Producer/Programmer)
 Murugan
 Pruthvi (Art Director) 
 Hemanth Kumar (Art Department)
 Manikant (MI Bar Controller)
 Prem (Multi Recorder)
 Pradeep (Sound Engineer)
 FMC Camera Team
 Manju (Electrician)

Choregrapher 
 Varadharajan
 Tharak Xavier
 Jai 
 Ambari Raju
 Surya
 Suchin
 Jaggi
 Anil
 Sudhir
 Bala Narasimha

Costume & Make Up 
 Rajesh Shetty (Costume Designer)
 Ajit (Celebrity Costume Designer)  
 Roshan Ayyapa (Celebrity Costume Designer) 
 Kumar (Make Up Artist)
 Salam (Special Make up Artist)

Production Team 
 Shiva (Production Controller)
 Prasanth Harry
 Ramaya Bhaswaraj
 Nagendra 
 Teju
 Bhaswaraj 
 Suchin
 Kiran Gowda

Contestants 
A total of 14 celebrity couples, mostly TV actors are part  of the show.

Weekly summary

References

External links 
 Colors Kannada
 Lokesh Productions

2022 Indian television series debuts
Kannada-language television shows
Colors Kannada original programming
Indian television series based on non-Indian television series
Indian dance television shows
Celebrity reality television series